Swing's the Thing may refer to:
Swing's the Thing (Illinois Jacquet album), 1957
Swing's the Thing (Al Sears album), 1961